Battle Magic is the third album by Bal-Sagoth, released in 1998 on Cacophonous Records, and is their last recording for that company before they signed to Nuclear Blast. It is the last album to feature Jonny Maudling on drums, who following this album would go on to concentrate fully on playing the keyboards.

The cover artwork for the album features the fantasy character "Caylen-Tor", created by Bal-Sagoth vocalist/lyricist Byron Roberts. The character was originally introduced in the lyrics of the band's previous album Starfire Burning Upon the Ice-Veiled Throne of Ultima Thule and would later appear in two novels written by Roberts, "The Chronicles of Caylen-Tor" and "The Chronicles of Caylen-Tor Volume II", both published by DMR Books.

The band were awarded one full month to record, much of which was spent on the orchestral arrangements. The keyboards in "Blood Slakes the Sand at the Circus Maximus" alone took six full days to complete. The opening of "Blood Slakes the Sand at the Circus Maximus" is identical to the score for the film Spartacus, composed by Alex North.

On 16 September 2016, Battle Magic was reissued on CD by Cacophonous Records, featuring remastered audio, an expanded lyric booklet and new cover artwork.

Track listing 
All songs composed by Byron Roberts and Jonny and Chris Maudling.

Personnel 
 Byron Roberts – vocals
 Chris Maudling – guitars, bass
 Jonny Maudling – drums, keyboards

Additional personnel 
 Mags – producer, engineering
 Jeroen van Valkenburg – artwork (inner inlay)
 J.C. Dhien – photography
 Simon Lee – artwork

References 

Bal-Sagoth albums
1998 albums
Cacophonous Records albums